The 2010 Canberra Raiders season was the 29th in the club's history. They competed in the NRL's 2010 Telstra Premiership and finished the regular season 7th (out of 16). They then proceeded as far as the second week of the finals when they were knocked out by the Wests Tigers.

Season summary
The 2010 season began poorly for the Raiders with a loss to Penrith in the opening round however against early-season expectations that the Raiders would again struggle the club posted early season wins over Brisbane in round two, Parramatta in round five and the New Zealand Warriors in round eight in New Zealand in what was the club's first win in New Zealand since the early 2000s. However, losses to Todd Carney's new club the Roosters in round six and a narrow loss at home to the South Sydney Rabbitohs in round seven saw the club sitting second from last after round seven (last had the Melbourne Storm not been stripped of competition points due to salary cap breaches) of the 2010 season. Wins over the ladder-leading Dragons and the Gold Coast Titans followed until a four-game losing streak ensued; with the club sitting third from last after a round 17 home loss to the Roosters in what was Todd Carney's return to the nation's capital. The Raiders then began a run similar to that of Parramatta last year; winning eight of their next nine regular season matches to sneak into the top eight by season's end. The regular season's highest home attendance came when 20,445 fans filled Canberra Stadium to see the Raiders defeat the ladder-leading Dragons 32-16 for the second time in the season.

The Raiders advanced to the finals on the back of eight wins from their past nine and were drawn a tough away final against the second-placed Penrith Panthers whom the Raiders had beaten just five weeks earlier. The Raiders led from the start and despite lapses at times during the match they managed a narrow 24–22 win, thus achieving its first final win in a decade, which was also against the Panthers. This saw the Raiders draw a home final against the Wests Tigers in round two of the finals. Having lost to the Tigers twice during the regular season, it was hoped that a record crowd of 26,746 would inspire the Raiders to continue their fairytale run deep into the finals, however a missed penalty attempt by Jarrod Croker in the final minutes of the match saw Canberra lose by 26–24 and therefore draw a curtain on the Raiders' 2010 season.

Results

*Finished round in 15th but promoted to 14th after Melbourne were stripped of competition points

Club awards

2010 squad

Preseason transfers
IN
 Danny Galea (from Wests Tigers)
 Reece Robinson (from Brisbane Broncos)
OUT
 Phil Graham (to Sydney Roosters)
 Nigel Plum (to Penrith Panthers)
 Adrian Purtell (to Penrith Panthers)
 Stuart Flanagan (to Cronulla Sharks)
 Glen Turner (Retired)

Midseason transfers
IN
 Adam Mogg (from Catalans Dragons)

Ladders

References

External links

Canberra Raiders seasons
Canberra Raiders